Sirugamani is a panchayat town in Tiruchirappalli district in the Indian state of Tamil Nadu. It's situated on the banks of river cauvery, just a few miles away from Trichy on the way towards Karur. To be specific, it is in between Perugamani and Kaavalkara Palayam near Pettavaaithalai.

Demographics
 India census, Sirugamani had a population of 10,031. Males constitute 50% of the population and females 50%. Sirugamani has an average literacy rate of 72%, higher than the national average of 59.5%: male literacy is 80%, and female literacy is 64%. In Sirugamani, 11% of the population is under 6 years of age. Mr KRR Rajalingam was the only person to become chairman of Sirugamani town panchayat for two times (1996–2001) and (2006–2011). His father Mr R. Rathinagiri was the former chairman of Sirugamani town Panchayat.

References

Villages in Tiruchirappalli district